Rayagada (Sl. No.: 140) is a Vidhan Sabha constituency of Rayagada district, Odisha.

This constituency includes Rayagada, Rayagada block and Kashipur block.

Elected Members

Sixteen elections were held between 1951 and 2019.Elected members from the Rayagada constituency are:
2019: (140): Shri Makaranda Muduli (Independent)
2014: (140): Lal Bihari Himirika (BJD)
2009: (140): Lal Bihari Himirika (BJD)
2004: (82): Ulaka Rama Chandra (Congress)
2000: (82): Lal Bihari Himirika (BJD)
1995: (82): Ulaka Rama Chandra (Congress)
1990: (82): Ulaka Rama Chandra (Congress)
1985: (82): Ulaka Rama Chandra (Congress)
1980: (82): Ulaka Rama Chandra (Congress-I)
1977: (78): Ulaka Rama Chandra (Congress)
1974: (78): Ulaka Rama Chandra (Congress)
1971: (78): Himaruka Rukuna (Swatantra Party)
1967: (78): Anantaram Majhi (Congress)
1961: (10): Musuri Santa Pangi (Congress)
1957: (8): Kamayya Mandangi (Congress)
1951: (7): Kamaya Mandangi (Congress)

2019 Election Result

2014 Election Result
In 2014 election, Biju Janata Dal candidate Lalbihari Himirika defeated Indian National Congress candidate Makaranda Muduli by a margin of 8,286 votes.

2009 Election Result
In 2009 election, Biju Janata Dal candidate Lal Bihari Himirika defeated Indian National Congress candidate Ulaka Rama Chandra by a margin of 15,661 votes.

Notes

References

Assembly constituencies of Odisha
Rayagada district